Clayton Beddoes (born November 10, 1970) is a Canadian ice hockey coach and former professional ice hockey centre. He played two seasons in the National Hockey League. He last coached the Italian team HC Bolzano, and has coached the Italian national team at two World Championships.

Playing career 

He spent four years playing college ice hockey at Lake Superior State University between 1990 and 1994, earning All-NCAA Second Team honors along with NCAA's Championship All-Tournament Team and All-CCHA Second Team distinction his senior year. He also served as the Lakers' team captain in his final year at LSSU.

Beddoes was signed as a free agent by the Boston Bruins in 1994 and spent the 1994-95 season with the team's AHL affiliate, the Providence Bruins. He played sixty career NHL games between 1995 and 1997, scoring two goals and eight assists for ten points.

Beddoes scored his first NHL goal on December 2, 1995 in Boston's 6-4 home victory over the Buffalo Sabres.

After spending the 1997-98 season with the Detroit Vipers of the International Hockey League (65 games: 22 goals, 24 assists), Beddoes signed with the Berlin Capitals of the German elite league Deutsche Eishockey Liga (DEL) in 1998. He made 52 appearances for the Capitals in the 1998-99 DEL season, tallying 17 goals, while assisting on 26 more. 

He spent two more years in the German top-flight, playing for Adler Mannheim and Düsseldorfer EG. He split his last season as a professional athlete (2001–02) between WCHL's Anchorage Aces and Italian team WSV Sterzing. In 2002, Beddoes had to put an end to his playing career due to shoulder issues.

Coaching career 
After his retirement in 2002, he began a coaching career in Germany. He served one year as assistant coach of DEL's Iserlohn Roosters (2005–06), followed by a two-year stint in the same position at fellow DEL side Kölner Haie. In September 2008, he was promoted to the head coaching job after the Haie organization had sacked Doug Mason, but was relieved of his duties after only 71 days in that position. He then joined the Frankfurt Lions' coaching staff as an assistant for 2009-10. After the Lions' organization had withdrawn from the German top-flight and made a fresh start in the third-division, Beddoes took over as head coach in 2010-11.

He then embarked on a two-year stint as head coach of Italian Serie A club SG Cortina.

The 2014-15 season saw him serve as skill and development coach of the Red Deers Rebels in the WHL.

In April 2015, Beddoes was named head coach of WSV Sterzing, returning to the Serie A and the club where he spent the last days of his playing career. In July 2017, he was named assistant coach at ERC Ingolstadt of the German DEL and stayed at the job until the end of the 2017-18 season.

On September 28, 2017, he was appointed as head coach of the Italian men's national team.

On March 11, 2019, just before EBEL play-off beginning, Beddoes becomes head coach of Italian team HC Bolzano.

Regular season and playoffs

Awards and honours

References

External links

1970 births
Living people
Adler Mannheim players
Anchorage Aces players
Berlin Capitals players
Boston Bruins players
Canadian expatriate ice hockey players in Germany
Canadian ice hockey centres
Canadian ice hockey coaches
Detroit Vipers players
Düsseldorfer EG players
Ice hockey people from Alberta
Italy men's national ice hockey team coaches
Lake Superior State Lakers men's ice hockey players
Löwen Frankfurt coaches
NCAA men's ice hockey national champions
Providence Bruins players
Red Deer Rustlers players
Undrafted National Hockey League players
Weyburn Red Wings players
AHCA Division I men's ice hockey All-Americans